Klages may refer to:

 Ellen Klages (born 1954), American fiction author
 Fred Klages (born 1943), American former professional baseball player
 Ludwig Klages (1872–1956), German philosopher

See also
 The Second Awakening of Christa Klages, 1978 film
 Klages's antwren (Myrmotherula klagesi), species of bird 

German-language surnames